Tabunungda Akaiba Likli is a 2013 Indian Meitei language film directed by Romi Meitei and produced by Barun. It stars Gokul Athokpam, Abenao Elangbam, Hamom Sadananda and Artina Thoudam in the lead, with Deky, Dhanapriya, Priyogopal, and Modhubala portraying supporting roles. It is a love triangle film.
The film was premiered at Manipur Film Development Corporation (MFDC) on 21 September 2013. It was also premiered at Dussehra Ground Mukherjee Nagar, New Delhi on 28 September 2013.

Synopsis
Ningthem's mother is impatient to get her son married but his girlfriend Phajabi is not ready for it. Due to his mother's stubbornness, Ningthem returns to Imphal from Delhi. There, he meets Thoibi whom Ningthem requested to help him in fulfilling his mother's wish and marry him just for namesake. Out of her love for Ningthem, Thoibi accepts his request without a second thought. After the marriage and their return to Delhi, Thoibi witnesses the love affair that is going on between Ningthem and Phajabi.

Thoibi bears all the pain with utmost dignity as she accepted Ningthem's request. But her heart breaks like a broken glass to see her married life turning topsy-turvy. She finally gears up all her courage to return home but God has other plans for Thoibi.

Cast
 Gokul Athokpam as Ningthem
 Abenao Elangbam as Thoibi
 Artina Thoudam as Phajabi
 Hamom Sadananda as Businessman
 Gurumayum Priyogopal as Thoibi's father
 Thoudam Ongbi Modhubala as Ningthem's mother
 Deky Khundrakpam as Maipak
 Dhanapriya as Bembem, Maipak's girlfriend

Production
This movie is the second production of Pibarel Films, after producing Sadananda-Kamala starrer Khangdreda Nongdamba. The shooting of the film was done in Manipur and New Delhi.

Accolades
It won many awards at the 3rd Sahitya Seva Samiti Manipuri Film Award (SSS MANIFA) 2014, organised by Sahitya Seva Samiti, Kakching and Film Forum Manipur, at Kakching Khullen Ibudhou Khamlangba Laikol on 21 April 2014.

References

2010s Meitei-language films
2013 films